William Tempest (1682–1761) was an English barrister and Fellow of the Royal Society.

Life
He was the son of William Tempest, Prothonotary of the Court of Common Pleas, and his wife Elizabeth Cooke, born  16 April 1682. He was educated at Eton College and matriculated at King's College, Cambridge in 1700. He in turn became Prothonotary of the Court of Common Pleas.

Tempest was elected to the Royal Society in 1712. There he was in a small group of Fellows regarded in 1718 as expert in "husbandry, gardening and planting" (with Robert Balle, Richard Bradley, John Mortimer and Hans Sloane).

Tempest resided at Shepherds, Cranbrook, Kent. He died on 15 August 1761.

Family
Tempest married in 1707 Elizabeth Hyland, daughter of Samuel Hyland of Bodiam, Sussex.

Notes

1682 births
1761 deaths
People educated at Eton College
Fellows of the Royal Society
Alumni of King's College, Cambridge
People from Cranbrook, Kent
English barristers